Central Coast United FC, is a semi-professional soccer club, based and located on the Central Coast of New South Wales. As of the 2022 season, the club's senior teams compete in the NSW League One competitions and the clubs youth team compete in NSW League Two competitions.

Senior team history 

In 2017, the club applied and was granted a licence to compete under from the start of the 2018 season.

In both the 2018 and 2019 season, Club Captain Daniel McFarlane won NSW State League Player of the Year.

In the club's first season they narrowly lost out on promotion by a single point, an incredible achievement in their first season. The club emphatically bounced back to secure the Grand Final Championship with a victory over Bankstown United. The 2019 season saw Central Coast United again be successful as in July 2019, the club secured promotion to National Premier Leagues NSW 3 with a 3-1 victory over Prospect United in their 2nd ever season. Another marvellous achievement was set as the 2019 season for Central Coast United as it was declared the most successful Central Coast side in history due to the Under 15s, 16s, 18s, 20s and the 1st Team all outright winners of the league.

The 2022 season saw even more success for the club as it gained promotion to the NSW League One competition after a 1–1 draw with Canterbury Bankstown on 16 July 2022.

Club Honours 

NSW League Two Premiership
Runners-up: 2022
NSW State League/NSW League Three Club Championship
Winners: 2019
NSW State League/NSW League Three Premiership
Winners: 2019
Runners-up: 2018
NSW State League/NSW League Three Championship
Winners: 2018
Runners-up: 2019

Head-to-head records

NPL Teams

Includes NPL Matches and Australia Cup Matches

Non NPL Teams

Club colours 
The club colours are black and gold with white. The club's home kit was revealed in February 2022, the club will play in gold with black trim. The away kit has been confirmed as a white kit with gold pinstripes. The logo which is inspired by the skull and crossbones was designed by designer Matthew Wolff who has designed LAFC and NYCFC logo's as well as the high-selling Nigeria 2018 World Cup kit.

Seasons

League

Cup

Current squad 
As of 13 August 2022

Club Officials

Notable former players 
Previously as the main feeder club for the Central Coast Mariners, several players have already gone in the A-League and most recently the 2009 AFC Champions League, which the Mariners qualified for. Notable former players include
 Matt Simon
 Damien Brown
 Bradley Porter
 Matthew Trott
 Mitchell Prentice
 Dean Heffernan
 Matt Crowell

Notes

References

External links 
 CC Football

Soccer clubs on the Central Coast, New South Wales